Too much information may refer to:

 Information overload, the notion that access to excessive information hampers understanding and decision-making
The idea that personal information has been shared that should be kept private

Media 
 Too Much Information (album), a 2014 album by Maxïmo Park
 "Too Much Information", a song by Duran Duran from the 1993 Wedding Album
 "Too Much Information", a 1981 song by The Police, from the Ghost in the Machine album
 "Too Much Information", a 1999 song by Quiet Riot, from the Alive and Well album
 "Too Much Information", a 2010 song by Railroad Earth
 Too Much Information (TV series), a Canadian comedy show (2014–2015)

See also
 TMI (disambiguation)